Hingham School District is a school district that serves Hingham, Massachusetts, USA.

Schools
Plymouth River Elementary School
South Elementary School
Foster Elementary School
East Elementary School
Hingham Middle School.  Hingham Middle School is the only public school in Hingham serving three educational grades, 6-8. The school was formed by the merger of South and Central Junior High Schools in the 1990s.  
Hingham High School. Hingham High School is a co-educational, public high school serving grades 9 through 12 for the Town of Hingham. It is located on Union Street near Hingham Center. This school was ranked number 985 on Newsweek's 2005 list of the Best High Schools in America.

See also
List of school districts in Massachusetts

References

External links

Hingham High Alumni, Hingham, MA, alumni website

School districts in Massachusetts
Hingham, Massachusetts
Education in Plymouth County, Massachusetts